M Countdown is a South Korean music program broadcast by Mnet from the CJ E&M Center Studio in Sangam-dong, Mapo District, Seoul. It features appearances by popular music artists who also perform live on stage. First hosted by Leeteuk, Shindong, and Kangin of Super Junior, the show has had several other celebrities serve as emcees through the years. Miyeon of (G)I-dle and Joohoney of Monsta X are the current hosts of M Countdown as of 2023.

Broadcast 
M Countdown airs live on domestic television at 6PM KST every Thursday. Live streaming is available internationally via the M Countdown On Air page on Mwave's website.

In the Philippines, online multi-view live broadcast of the show is available via gigafest.smart. It began airing on the free-to-air TV5 network from January 31, 2021, however due to low ratings on the network, it will conclude on March 6, 2022. Full episodes with English subtitles are shown every Sunday night, along with another K-Chart show Music Bank on GMA HallyPop. Meanwhile, some episodes of M Countdown like Hot Debut and Comeback Stages are already available on YouTube Philippines since January 2022.

Segments 
Current segments on the show include MCD Dance Challenge, MCD Vocal Challenge, Storage M, and M Studio. Discontinued segments formerly aired include: B'SHOP (songwriter Bang Si-hyuk introduced a selection of hit songs), MCD Drama (show-hosts acted out various scenarios), MCD News (reported music industry news), and MCD Ranking (ranked celebrities based on certain topics).

Official hosts

 Leeteuk and Shindong, with Kangin (November 2005 – August 2007)
 Leeteuk, Shindong, and Eunhyuk (August 16, 2007 – March 27, 2008)
 2PM's Nichkhun, Junho, and Chansung, 2AM's Jo Kwon and Jung Jin-woon, CNBLUE's Kang Min-hyuk, and MBLAQ's Lee Joon and G.O (February 18, 2010–??, 2010)
 Tony Ahn and Shin So-yul (March 10, 2011 – August 23, 2012)
 Lee Hong-gi (August 30, 2012 – December 13, 2012)
 Kim Woo-bin (August 15, 2013 – February 13, 2014)
 Ahn Jae-hyun and Jung Joon-young (February 27, 2014 – November 20, 2014)
 Lee Jung-shin, Key, BamBam and Park Jin-young (March 19, 2015 – March 3, 2016)
 Lee Jung-shin and Key (March 17, 2016 – September 8, 2016)
 Key (September 22, 2016 – April 13, 2017)
 Daehwi and Han Hyun-min (April 4, 2019 – February 4, 2021)
 Miyeon and Nam Yoon-su (February 18, 2021 – January 19, 2023)
 Miyeon (January 26, 2023 – present)
 Miyeon and Joohoney (February 23, 2023 – present)

In February 2010, Mnet announced a new group of eight emcees, comprising select members from 2PM, 2AM, CNBLUE, and MBLAQ. Nicknamed "MCD GUYZ", they hosted the show in subgroups of three or four at a time. This marked the first time M Countdown deviated from its tradition of having 1–2 fixed presenters.

Following Key's departure as host on April 13, 2017, M Countdown announced the implementation of a "special MC system" of guest presenters since a permanent replacement had not yet been decided. The first "new" hosts selected were girl group singers Hani from EXID, and Kyulkyung and Nayoung from Pristin—they appeared on the April 20 broadcast.

Between April 2018 and March 2019, the show was hosted by a "Global MC Crew" of idols who spoke various foreign languages.

Following Nam's departure as host in 2023, on the January 19 episode, M Countdown announced Joohoney of Monsta X as the show's new co-host on January 27. He will begin MC duties effective the February 23 broadcast. In the interim, (G)-Idle bandmate Song Yuqi, and HueningKai of Tomorrow X Together served as special MC's alongside Miyeon on the February 2 and 9 episodes respectively.

M Countdown chart
Chart rankings are calculated by combining the following for a total of 11,000 points:
 Digital music sales from Circle (50%)
 Social media points from official YouTube music video views (10%)
 Album sales data from Circle (15%)
 Global fan votes via Mnet Plus (15%)
 Mnet broadcast points (10%)
 Live-vote (10%; first-place nominees only)

Data is collected from Monday to Sunday.

Songs can win a maximum of three times before being removed from the chart.

Girls' Generation was the only act to achieve the perfect score of 10,000 points under the fourth and fifth scoring systems. Since then, only Exo, BTS, Shinee, Twice, and NU'EST have achieved the perfect score of 11,000 points.

Winners
While previous revisions of this article included winners from 2004 to 2007, that information was not supported by any secondary sources since its initial addition in 2011. A lack of media coverage of the show on Naver for those particular years makes sourcing the information difficult. As such, those sections have been removed from the page and only winners from 2008 to present are cited.

Triple crowns 
The term triple crown refers to when a song achieves three wins on the show. After that, it becomes ineligible for first place and is removed from the chart. The following is a list of all songs that have achieved a triple crown on M Countdown from 2008 to present.

Achievements by artists 

Most No. 1 winners

Most Triple Crowns

Top 10 Highest Scores (1st-6th System) July 29, 2004 – March 3, 2011

Top 10 Highest Scores (7th System) March 10, 2011 – December 15, 2011

Scoring System: Digital Single Sales (40%), Album Sales (10%), Asia/Global Fan Vote (15%), Preferences of Music Experts (10%), Real-Time Charts (15%), SMS Vote (10%)

Top 10 Highest Scores (8th System) December 22, 2011 – August 23, 2012

Scoring System: Digital Single Sales (45%), Album Sales (10%), Global Fan Vote (15%), Mnet Broadcasting (5%), Preferences of Music Experts (10%), Real-Time Charts (5%), SMS Vote (10%)

Top 10 Highest Scores (9th-10th System) August 30, 2012 – February 20, 2014

Scoring System: Digital Single Sales (50%), Album Sales (10%), Age Preference (20%), Global Fan Vote (5%), Live Show Preferences (10%), SMS Vote (5%)

Top 10 Highest Scores (11th-12th System) February 27, 2014 – June 4, 2015

Scoring System: Digital Single Sales (50%), Album Sales (10%), Social Media Points (10%: YouTube official music video views + SNS buzz), Preference Points (10%: global fan votes + age range preference), Mnet Broadcast Points (10%), SMS Votes (10%)

Top 10 Highest Scores (13th-15th System) June 11, 2015 – April 12, 2018

Scoring System: Digital Music Sales (50%), Album Sales (15%), Social Media Score (15%: YouTube official music video views + SNS buzz), Popularity Score (10%: global fan votes + age range preference), Mnet Broadcast Score (10%) + SMS Voting Score (10%)

Top 10 Highest Scores (16th-18th System) April 26, 2018 – May 21, 2020

Scoring System: Digital Music Sales (45%), Album Sales (15%), Social Media Score (20%: YouTube official music video views + SNS buzz), Global Fan Votes (10%), Mnet Broadcast Score (10%), SMS Live Vote (10%)

Top 10 Highest Scores (19th-20th System) May 28, 2020 – April 7, 2022

Scoring System: Digital Sales (45%: Melon, Genie, FLO), Album Sales (15%), Social Media (15%: YouTube MV views), Global Fan Vote (15%), Mnet Broadcast (10%: Mnet TV, MCD Stage, M2 Contents), Live Vote (10%: first-place nominees only)

Top 10 Highest Scores (Current System) April 14, 2022 – present

Scoring System: Digital Sales (50%), Album Sales (15%), Social Media (10%), Global Fan Vote (15%), Mnet Broadcast (10%), Live Vote (10%)

Top 10 Highest Scores (All Time)

Similar programs 
KBS Music Bank
MBC Show! Music Core
SBS Inkigayo
Arirang TV Pops in Seoul
Arirang TV Simply K-Pop (formerly called The M-Wave and Wave K) 
JTBC Music on Top
JTBC Music Universe K-909
MBC M Show Champion
SBS M The Show

See also 
 KCON (music festival)
 Music programs of South Korea

Notes

References

External links 
 

2010s South Korean television series
2004 South Korean television series debuts
South Korean music chart television shows
Mnet (TV channel) original programming
Korean-language television shows